The canton of Côte d'Argent is an administrative division of the Landes department, southwestern France. It was created at the French canton reorganisation which came into effect in March 2015. Its seat is in Mimizan.

Composition

It consists of the following communes:
 
Aureilhan
Bias
Castets
Léon
Lévignacq
Linxe
Lit-et-Mixe
Mézos
Mimizan
Pontenx-les-Forges
Saint-Julien-en-Born
Saint-Michel-Escalus
Saint-Paul-en-Born
Taller
Uza
Vielle-Saint-Girons

Councillors

Pictures of the canton

References

Cantons of Landes (department)